The Risto Jarva Award is an annual film industry award for new Finnish short films named after the Finnish filmmaker Risto Jarva. The winner is chosen by a jury of no more than three members that changes every year. Jury members are selected by the Finnish Film Foundation, which has funded and presented the award at the Tampere Film Festival since 1979.

Winners

References

External links 
 Tampere Film Festival
 List of winners 

Awards established in 1979
Finnish film awards